Jacksonville Independent School District is a public school district based in Jacksonville, Texas, United States. Brad Stewart is currently the superintendent of JISD.

In addition to Jacksonville, the district serves the towns of Cuney and Gallatin, and rural areas in northwestern Cherokee County.

In 2009, the school district was rated "academically acceptable" by the Texas Education Agency.

Info

Mascot: Indians (HS), Braves (MS)

Colors: Blue and Gold

School Song

Schools

High School (Grades 9-12)
Jacksonville High School

Middle School (Grades 7-8)
Jacksonville Middle School

Intermediate School (Grades 5-6)
Nichols Intermediate School

Elementary Schools (Grades PK-4)
East Side Elementary School
Fred Douglass Elementary School
West Side Elementary School 
Joe Wright Elementary School

Alternative School (Grades PK-12)
Compass Center

See also

List of school districts in Texas
List of high schools in Texas

References

External links
Jacksonville ISD
Jacksonville ISD on Facebook
Jacksonville Education Foundation, accepts donations, coordinates scholarships, and an alumni database

School districts in Cherokee County, Texas